The 2016–17 season is Dumbarton's fifth consecutive season back in the second tier of Scottish football and their fourth season in the Scottish Championship, having won promotion via the play-offs from the Scottish Second Division at the end of the 2011–12 season. This is Stevie Aitken's second full season as manager.

Dumbarton finished eighth in the Scottish Championship. Dumbarton did not advance beyond the group stage of the newly revamped League Cup, drawing 2 and losing 2 of the qualifying matches. In the Challenge Cup, Dumbarton's abysmal record in this competition continued (5 wins from 31 starts) with a third round exit to League One opponents, Stranraer.  And it was a disastrous first hurdle exit to non-league junior side Bonnyrigg Rose in the third round of the Scottish Cup.

Results & fixtures

Pre Season

League Cup

Challenge Cup

Scottish Championship

Scottish Cup

Player statistics

Squad 
Last updated 7 May 2017

|}

Transfers

Players in

Players out

See also
List of Dumbarton F.C. seasons

References

Dumbarton F.C. seasons
Scottish football clubs 2016–17 season